Brian Keith Evans (born September 13, 1973) is an American former professional basketball player who played in the National Basketball Association (NBA) and other leagues. A 6'8" and 220 lb forward, he played high school basketball at Terre Haute, Indiana South. Evans attended Indiana University from 1991–96, and played for the Hoosiers from 1992–96. Evans was named Big Ten MVP in 1996. He was selected with the 27th overall pick in the 1996 NBA Draft by the Orlando Magic.

He played professionally in Italy for Lineltex Imola (1999–2000), Montepaschi Siena (2000–2001) and Viola Reggio Calabria (2001–2002).

As of February 2016, he was the co-owner of Precision Medical Group, an Indianapolis-based company that sells medical products.

References

External links
College & NBA stats @ basketballreference.com

1973 births
Living people
All-American college men's basketball players
American expatriate basketball people in Italy
American expatriate basketball people in Japan
American men's basketball players
Basketball players from Illinois
Indiana Hoosiers men's basketball players
Medalists at the 1995 Summer Universiade
Mens Sana Basket players
Minnesota Timberwolves players
New Jersey Nets players
Orlando Magic draft picks
Orlando Magic players
Pallacanestro Reggiana players
Small forwards
Sportspeople from Rockford, Illinois
Sportspeople from Terre Haute, Indiana
Sun Rockers Shibuya players
Viola Reggio Calabria players
Universiade gold medalists for the United States
Universiade medalists in basketball